Mitri is a surname. Notable people with this name include:

Surname
 Elie Mitri (born 1980), Lebanese actor, writer and stand-up comedian
 James Mitri (born 1999), New Zealand cyclist
 Leonardo De Mitri (1914–1956), Italian film director and screenwriter
 Tarek Mitri (born 1950), Lebanese professor
 Tiberio Mitri (1926–2001), Italian boxer

Given name
 Mitri Raheb, Palestinian pastor
 Mitri al-Murr (1880–1969), Lebanese deacon, composer and scholar